The 1977 Colorado State Rams football team was an American football team that represented Colorado State University in the Western Athletic Conference (WAC) during the 1977 NCAA Division I football season. In its fifth season under head coach Sark Arslanian, the team compiled a 9–2–1 record (5–2 against WAC opponents).

Schedule

Team players in the NFL

References

Colorado State
Colorado State Rams football seasons
Colorado State Rams football